The USRC Snohomish was a  seagoing tug built at the specific direction of Congress by Pusey & Jones, Wilmington, Delaware for service on the Pacific Northwest coast. She was fitted with latest lifesaving and property saving equipment available at the time of her construction and originally cost $189,000.
 She was commissioned by the United States Revenue Cutter Service on 15 November 1908 and arrived at her homeport of Neah Bay, Washington by way of passage around Cape Horn in 1909.

Snohomish was a regular part of the Bering Sea Patrol and enforced international sealing regulations. Her duties included search and rescue, law enforcement, fisheries patrol, mail delivery to light ships and remote stations, patrolling regattas, and towing disabled vessels.

She served her entire career in the Pacific Northwest and was decommissioned and sold 1 December 1934.

See also

The Coast Guard commissioned a second vessel, the USCGC Snohomish (WYTM-98) in 1944.

Notes
Citations

References cited

  
 

Snohomish
Snohomish